Lonsdale railway station is located on the Seaford line. Situated in the southern Adelaide suburb of Lonsdale, it is 26.7 kilometres from Adelaide station.

History

Lonsdale station opened in 1976 as a part of the extension of the line from Marino. The station was staffed in the early days of the station but the building part of the platform has since been demolished, and there is no evidence of the building left. The original 1976 shelters remained until 2011.

Collision incident
On the evening of August 27, 2018, an unoccupied KIA sedan was pushed onto the tracks by two men who had been vandalizing cars at the station. An express train bound for Seaford collided with the car moments later, destroying the car and causing $100,000 of damage to the train. There were no fatalities or injuries in the collision. Both perpetrators were arrested for the following day. One was handed down a three year, six month jail term. The other was handed down a two year, five month term in October 2019.

Services by platform

References

External links

Railway stations in Adelaide
Railway stations in Australia opened in 1976